Max Radin (March 29, 1880 – June 22, 1950 ) was an American legal scholar, philologist, and author.  The noted anthropological scholar Paul Radin was his younger brother.

Life and work 
Max Radin, son of the rabbi Adolph Moses Radin, was born in Kempen, German Empire, he emigrated with his family to the United States and grew up in New York. He received his early education from his father, who, among other things, taught him to speak Latin. Max studied at the City College of New York (BA 1899) and the School of Law at Columbia University (LL.B. 1902). After graduation, he worked as a lawyer and public school teacher in New York and continued his studies at Columbia University, where in 1909, with a thesis on ancient Associations, he was granted a Ph.D. From 1907 he worked at Newton High School. In 1918 he was appointed Instructor of Law at Columbia University.

In 1919, Radin left New York and went to California. In 1922 he married Dorothea Prall, a writer and translator of Russian and Polish poetry. At the University of California, Berkeley, he became a professor of Law, where he remained until his retirement in 1948. He was named the John Henry Boalt Professor of Law in 1940. During his time at Berkeley, he was a visiting professor at the Yale Law School (1940), at Pacific University in Oregon (1946) and Columbia University (1947). In 1949 he was member of Institute for Advanced Study in Princeton, New Jersey. In 1948 he received a doctorate at Whitman College.

In his work, Radin combined philological research into Roman and civil law with current legal issues. He published more than 700 works, including several professional and popular scientific monographs and manuals. Of Radin's work, Justice William O. Douglas said: "His is part of the tradition of Holmes and Cardozo in his influence on the Law."

Works 
 The Legislation of the Greeks and Romans on Corporations. New York 1910 (Dissertation)
 The Jews among the Greeks and Romans. Philadelphia 1915
 Handbook of Roman Law. St. Paul (MN) 1925
 Life of People in Biblical Times. Philadelphia 1929
 The Lawful Pursuit of Gain. Boston / New York 1929
 The Trial of Jesus of Nazareth. Chicago 1931
 Handbook of the Anglo-American Legal History. St. Paul (MN) 1936
 Artikel in Pauly-Wissowas Realencyclopädie der classischen Altertumswissenschaft (RE), Band XVII,2 (1937) und XVIII,1 (1939): Obligatio, Obsignatio, Obvagulatio, Oratio
 The Law and Mr. Smith. New York 1938
 Marcus Brutus. New York / London 1939
 Manners and Morals of Business. Indianapolis 1939
 Law as Logic and Experience. New Haven / London 1940
 The Day of Reckoning. New York 1943
 The Law and You. New York 1948
 Epicurus, My Master. Chapel Hill (NC) 1949
 Radin’s Law Dictionary. New York 1951

References

Further reading 
 Ward W. Briggs: Radin, Max. In: Biographical Dictionary of North American Classicists. Greenwood Press, Westport CT u. a. 1994, S. 514–515.

External links
 
 

1880 births
1950 deaths
American legal scholars
American legal writers
American male non-fiction writers
American people of Polish-Jewish descent
American philologists
City College of New York alumni
Columbia University faculty
German emigrants to the United States
Jewish American writers
People from Kępno County
People from the Province of Posen
UC Berkeley School of Law faculty
Whitman College alumni
20th-century American male writers
20th-century American non-fiction writers
20th-century philologists